Admiral Sir Arthur Auckland Leopold Pedro Cochrane,  (24 September 1824 – 20 August 1905) was a Royal Navy officer who served as Commander-in-Chief, Pacific Station.

Naval career
Born the third son of the tenth Earl of Dundonald, Cochrane joined the Royal Navy in 1839. He fought at Acre where he was wounded during the Oriental Crisis in 1840 and then served in the Baltic Sea during the Crimean War where he devised a method of towing torpedoes to their target using kites in 1855.

He later commanded HMS Warrior and then HMS Cumberland. He was appointed Superintendent of Sheerness dockyard in 1869 and Commander-in-Chief, Pacific Station in 1873. He was promoted to admiral in December 1881, and retired from the navy in June 1886. In retirement he was involved in managing the Trinidad Lake Asphalt Company.

In a letter to The Times in 1902, Admiral Cochrane wrote about attending the enthronement festivities of King Louis Philippe I of the French in Paris in 1830, being present at the Coronation of Queen Victoria in 1838, and the (at that point) recent Coronation of King Edward VII and Queen Alexandra earlier the same year.

References

1824 births
1905 deaths
Royal Navy admirals
Knights Commander of the Order of the Bath
Arthur